James Tonascia is an American biostatistician. He is the Curtis L. Meinert Professor of Clinical Trials at Johns Hopkins Bloomberg School of Public Health. He joined the faculty in 1970 and was promoted to full professor in 1981.

References

External links 

Living people
Year of birth missing (living people)
American statisticians
Biostatisticians
Johns Hopkins Bloomberg School of Public Health faculty
20th-century American mathematicians
21st-century American mathematicians